Lane Anderson Carson (born August 21, 1947 in New Orleans, Louisiana, USA) is a licensed building contractor, real estate broker, and attorney in private practice who resides in Covington, the parish seat of St. Tammany Parish.

Career

Carson was 1st Platoon Leader, A Company, 1/11 Infantry, 5th Mech Infantry Division during the Vietnam War. He was wounded in operation Dewey Canyon II (Lam Son 719), discharged and returned home. He received the Purple Heart, Vietnam Campaign Medal, Vietnam Service Medal and Combat Infantryman Badge.

References

External links
http://www.reagan.utexas.edu/archives/speeches/1985/121185a.htm
http://pview.findlaw.com/view/2879092_1?noconfirm=0
https://web.archive.org/web/20061113185312/http://www.usna.com/News_Pubs/News/SearchNewsRead.asp?Article=4907
https://web.archive.org/web/20060821211016/http://www.rejuvenola.com/
https://www.senate.gov/comm/banking_housing_and_urban_affairs/general/noms/nibs/carson.htm
http://www.sos.louisiana.gov:8090/cgibin/?rqstyp=elcpr&rqsdta=03090452
https://web.archive.org/web/20060928231151/http://www.nibs.org/July03.pdf
http://www.thenewsstar.com/apps/pbcs.dll/article?AID=/20071206/NEWS01/712060313

1947 births
Living people
United States Army personnel of the Vietnam War
Baptists from Louisiana
Louisiana Democrats
Louisiana Republicans
Louisiana State University alumni
Members of the Louisiana House of Representatives
Politicians from New Orleans
Protestants from Louisiana
People from Covington, Louisiana
Tulane University Law School alumni
United States Army officers
Lawyers from New Orleans
State cabinet secretaries of Louisiana